Chad Sugden (born 27 April 1994) is a British professional boxer and former kickboxer. As a boxer, he challenged for the British light-heavyweight title in 2020. As a kickboxer, he held the ISKA World and Intercontinental title at 72.5 kg.

Amateur career 
Sugden began his fighting career at the age of 5, alongside his younger brother Regis (4yrs), under the guidance of his father and WKA Light Middleweight World Champion Dean Sugden. During his time as an amateur Sugden collected an impressive array of accolades and gained notable media coverage as a kickboxer and boxer, often referred to as "the best in the world" and even earning a place at the WOF Asian Intercontinental games after a personal invite from the President of the Philippines.

In April 2008 Sugden travelled to Bangkok, Thailand to compete in the International Martial Arts Games where he won a Gold medal "in clinical fashion" solidifying his nickname "2Slick".

Sugden won the IKF Junior Amateur FCR Lightweight World Title on 29 November 2009 in Rochester, Kent, England when he defeated Charlie Ward by unanimous decision, 45-50, 47-48, 46-50.
When Sugden turned 18 in 2012, it moved him to an adult fighter and his "JUNIOR" (8-17) title was retired.

Sugden won the IKF Junior Amateur FCR Welterweight World Title on 16 October 2010 in Kelham, England when he defeated David Lenson (USA) Staten Island, New York USA, 18-2 by unanimous decision. 50-44, 49-45, 49-45.
When Sugden turned 18 in 2012, it moved him to an adult fighter and his "JUNIOR" (8-17) title was retired.

Sugden enjoyed great success as an amateur with a record of 100W-5L-0D, including a notable victory, at the age of 16, over the previously unbeaten, London based, Salah Khalifa  under K-1 rules. Khalifa's calibre as an opponent and world-class fighter is verified by his Sept 2014 match up with the great Yodsanklai.

Pro career 
On 31 March 2012, at just 17 years old, Sugden made his professional debut on the first "Main Event" and has since fought on Enfusion, Glory and more recently in Super Fights at the K-1 World Max Final 16 in Majorca, the K-1 World Max Final 8 in Gran Canaria and the K-1 World Max Final 4 in Azerbaijan.

Sugden is the first UK fighter signed up to a long term contract with K-1 Global and as well as being the youngest ever holder of the ISKA Professional World Title, in 2013 Peter Aerts presented Sugden with the ISKA Pro K-1 fighter of the year above many seasoned professionals.

One of the highlights of Sugden's career so far is his victory in the Fight Sport 8 Man Grand Prix in Warrington, England, where he beat Solomon Wickstead, Peter Tiarks and Kerrith Bella in one night to be crowned the UK K-1 Grand Prix 2012 8 Man Tournament Champion at 70 kg.

Titles and accomplishments

Kickboxing
Professional
International Sport Kickboxing Association
 2014 ISKA Oriental Rules World 72.3 kg Champion
 2012 ISKA K-1 Intercontinental 72.3 kg Champion

K-1
 UK K-1 Grand Prix 2012 8 Man Tournament Champion 70 kg max

Amateur
 Golden Belt World Champion
 2 x IKF World Champion 
 3 x EFK titles (Commonwealth, European and World Champion)
 ISKA National and British Full Contact Kickboxing Champion
 2 x WKA British Kickboxing Champion
 BLCC British Champion

Professional boxing record

Professional kickboxing record 

|-
|- style="background:#cfc;" 
| 07.08.15 ||  | Win ||  | Murthel Groenhart (NED) ||  | Glory 23: Las Vegas ||  | Las Vegas, Nevada, USA || | Decision (split) ||  | 3||3:00
|-
|- style="background:#fbb;"
| 05.23.15 ||  Loss||  Michael Wakeling (UK) || The Main Event ||  Birmingham, UK ||  Decision  ||  3||3:00
|-

|- style="background:#cfc;"
| 03.04.15 ||  Win ||  Atakan Arslan (TUR) ||  Glory 20: Dubai ||  Dubai, UAE ||  Decision ||  3||3:00

|- style="background:#cfc;"
| 07.06.14 ||  Win ||  Nathan Epps (ENG) ||  The Main Event, USN Arena ||  Bolton, England ||  Decision ||  3 ||3:00
|-
|- style="background:#fbb;"
| 26.04.14 ||  Loss || Enriko Kehl (GER) ||  Mix Fight Gala 15 ||  Darmstadt, Germany || Decision ||  3||3:00
|-
|- style="background:#fbb;"
| 23.02.14 ||  Loss || Alim Nabiev (UKR) || K-1 World max Final 4 || Baku, Azerbaijan ||  Decision || 3||3:00
|-
|- style="background:#cfc;"
| 11.01.14 ||  Win || Jorge Falcon (SPN) ||  K-1 max Quarter Final ||  Gran Canaria, Spain ||KO ||  1 ||
|-
|- style="background:#cfc;"
| 01.12.13 ||  Win ||  Ahmed Astitou (NED) ||  The Lancastrian Suite || Gateshead, England || Decision ||  3||3:00
|-
|- style="background:#fbb;"
| 14.09.13 ||  Loss ||  Cristopher Mena (SPN) ||  K-1 max Final 16 (reserve bout) ||  Palma, Mallorca ||  Decision ||  3||3:00
|-
|- style="background:#cfc;"
| 18.05.13 ||  Win ||  Paolo Fiorio (ITALY) ||  ||  Newark, England ||  Decision ||  5||3:00
|-
! style=background:white colspan=9 |

|- style="background:#cfc;"
| 23.03.13 || Win ||  Sam Wilson (ENG) ||  Glory 5: London ||  London, England ||  Decision ||  3||3:00
|-
|- style="background:#cfc;"
| 15.12.12 ||  Win ||  Costel Pasniciuc (ROM) ||   Pure force ||  Luton, England ||  Decision || | 5||3:00
|-
! style=background:white colspan=9 |

|- style="background:#cfc;"
| 28.10.12 ||  Win ||  Kerrith Bhella (ENG) ||  Fight Sport Grand Prix 70 kg MAX Tournament Final ||  Warrington, England ||  Decision ||  3||3:00
|-
|- style="background:#cfc;"
| 28.10.12 ||  Win ||  Peter Tiarks (ENG) || Fight Sport Grand Prix 70 kg MAX Tournament S-Final || Warrington, England || Decision ||  3||3:00

|- style="background:#cfc;"
| 28.10.12 ||  Win ||  Soloman Wickstead (ENG) ||  Fight Sport Grand Prix 70 kg MAX Tournament Q-Final ||  Warrington, England ||  Decision ||  3||3:00
|-
|- style="background:#cfc;"
 | 07.07.12 ||  Win || | Jake Barton (ENG) || | Xplosion at the indigO2 Arena ||  | London, England ||  | TKO ||  | 2 ||
|-
|- style="background:#cfc;"
 | 19.05.12 ||  | Win ||  | Amar Singh (ENG) ||  History in the Making ||  Newark, England ||  TKO ||  4||
|-
|- style="background:#cfc;" 
| 31.03.12 ||  | Win ||  | Joe Roberts (ENG) ||  | The Main Event ||  | Manchester, England ||  Decision || | 3 ||3:00
|-
| colspan=9 | Legend:

References

1994 births
Living people
Glory kickboxers
English male kickboxers